Regina Stanback Stroud (born 1957) is an American educator who serves as the Chancellor of the Peralta Community College District based in Oakland California.

Career 
She previously served as President of Skyline College (2011–2019), Vice President of Skyline College (2001–2011), Dean of Workforce and Economic Development of Mission College in Santa Clara (1997–2001).

In addition to her academic administrative roles, she has been a professor of nursing at Santa Ana College, a visiting professor of educational leadership at Mills College, and as an adjunct professor of educational leadership at San Francisco State University. Her academic work has centered around the intersection of critical race theory, black feminist thought, and women’s leadership. Her research interests include student equity and diversity, education/industry collaboratives, and community workforce and economic development.

Public Service and Philanthropy 
She was appointed by President Barack Obama to the President's Advisory Council on Financial Capability for Young Americans.  The Council published its findings in 2015

She has as a board member of various organizations, including the San Bruno Community Foundation, the San Mateo Community College Foundation, the United Way of the Bay Area, Base11, MaxGrad and Sierra Nevada Journeys.

Personal life 
She lives in Oakland California with her wife, Linda Collins.

References 

American academic administrators
Heads of universities and colleges in the United States
Women heads of universities and colleges
African-American academics
American women academics
African-American educators
Mills College alumni
People from Oakland, California
LGBT academics
Living people
1957 births
21st-century African-American people
20th-century African-American people
20th-century African-American women
21st-century African-American women